Hyporhamphus regularis   is a halfbeak garfish from the family Hemiramphidae. It is found in Australian waters. The red tip on the lower jaw is an identification feature.

References

regularis
Fish described in 1866
Taxa named by Albert Günther
Fish of Australia